New York City's 14th City Council district is one of 51 districts in the New York City Council. It is currently represented by Democrat Pierina Sanchez, who took office in 2022.

Geography
District 14 covers a stretch of the West Bronx along the Harlem River, including the neighborhoods of University Heights, Fordham, Morris Heights, and Kingsbridge.

The district overlaps with Bronx Community Boards 4, 5, 7 and 8, and with New York's 13th and 15th congressional districts. It also overlaps with the 29th and 33rd districts of the New York State Senate, and with the 77th, 78th, 81st, and 86th districts of the New York State Assembly.

Recent election results

2021
In 2019, voters in New York City approved Ballot Question 1, which implemented ranked-choice voting in all local elections. Under the new system, voters have the option to rank up to five candidates for every local office. Voters whose first-choice candidates fare poorly will have their votes redistributed to other candidates in their ranking until one candidate surpasses the 50 percent threshold. If one candidate surpasses 50 percent in first-choice votes, then ranked-choice tabulations will not occur.

2017

2013

References

New York City Council districts